Odontomyia argentata,  also called the silver colonel, is a European species of soldier fly.

Distrution
Central and East Europe, Russia, China, Mongolia.

References

Stratiomyidae
Diptera of Europe
Diptera of Asia
Insects described in 1794
Taxa named by Johan Christian Fabricius